Pukksatte Lifu, Purusotte Ella is a 2021 Indian Kannada-language comedy drama film directed by Aravind Kuplikar and starring Sanchari Vijay and Matangi Prasan, who starred in Kahi (2016).

Cast 
Sanchari Vijay as Shahjahan
Matangi Prasan as Sharada
Achyuth Kumar as Byregowda
Aravind Kuplikar as Vinay Mallya
Rangayana Raghu

Reception 
Sunayana Suresh of The Times of India opined that "Puksatte Lifu Pursotte Illa may have a moment or two where the story might meander away, but if one chooses to ignore that this film definitely is a breath of fresh air and proves that content is eventually the king in cinema". A Sharadhaa from The New Indian Express wrote that "Pukksatte Lifu... definitely has a dynamic story to tell, and it is a must-watch film for every person to understand how common people become puppets in the hands of a corrupt system". Bobby Sing of Firstpost stated that "Puksatte Lifu perfectly pays its respectable farewell to Vijay and so do we as viewers and his staunch fans". Vivek M. V. of Deccan Herald said that "‘Puksatte Lifu’ is filled with colourful characters backed by fine performers".

References